Lewis Taylor (birth unknown) is a professional rugby league footballer who played in the 2000s.

Background

Playing career

International honours
Taylor won a cap for Wales while at Leeds Rhinos in the 22–30 defeat by Scotland at Firhill Stadium, Glasgow, on Wednesday, 24 November 2004.

Club career
Taylor transferred from the Leeds Rhinos to the Keighley Cougars on 16 December 2004.

References

External links
Lennon answers distant Wales call
(archived by web.archive.org) Young Rhinos Head To Keighley
(archived by web.archive.org) Sultan Pushed All The Way in RL 9's Final

Living people
English people of Welsh descent
English rugby league players
Keighley Cougars players
Leeds Rhinos players
Place of birth missing (living people)
Rugby league props
Wales national rugby league team players
Year of birth missing (living people)